As end of 2022 the number of Ukrainians in Germany was approximately 1,164,200. In 2021 before the war in Ukraine was of 155,310. Germany's Ukrainians have created a number of institutions and organizations, such as the Central Association of Ukrainians in Germany and Association of Ukrainian Diaspora in Germany. Although most of Germany's Ukrainians are German citizens, many are Ukrainian students from Russia and Ukraine in Germany on an academic scholarship.

Tourist-visa scandal
In 1999, a conflict arose involving the German Foreign Minister Joschka Fischer, who eased conditions for citizens of the former Soviet states to get German visas. Many people opposed this claim that it enabled thousands to enter Germany illegally using the abuse of visas granted to them. The majority of Ukrainians that are in Germany on scholarship are there on such visas, adding to the controversy.

Some Ukrainian organizations in Germany have accused Germans of racism and prejudice, and of the belief that Ukrainians are only in Germany to work illegally.

Notable people

See also 
 Germany–Ukraine relations
 Germans in Ukraine
 Ukrainians in the Czech Republic
 Ukrainians in Poland

References

Germany
 
Ethnic groups in Germany
Ukrainian diaspora in Europe